Saxa is a brand of herbs, spices, salt and pepper in the United Kingdom and Australia.  Formerly a brand of Rank Hovis McDougall it became property of Premier Foods in 2007. As a result of the change, production of Saxa salt was moved from Middlewich in Cheshire, a traditional centre of the British salt industry, to factories at Worksop and Ashford, Kent.

Saxa has been described by The Independent as one of "Britain's best-known food brands." and in the Journal of Consumer Marketing, Mats Urde lists it alongside Bisto and Hovis.

In Australia, Saxa brand is owned by Kraft Heinz which acquired most of Cerebos Pacific assets in 2018.

References

Brand name condiments
Heinz brands
Premier Foods brands
Products introduced in 1907